The Midsternal line is used to describe a part of the surface anatomy of the anterior thorax. The midsternal line runs vertical down the middle of the sternum.

It can be interpreted as a component of the median plane.

See also
 Midclavicular line

References

External links
 

Anatomy